The Chocolate Mountains of Arizona, USA, are located in the southwestern part of the state east of the Trigo Mountains and southwest of the Kofa National Wildlife Refuge. The range in Arizona lies in a southwest-northeasterly direction west of Highway 95 on the U.S. Army Yuma Proving Ground. This area is patrolled by the Military Police from Marine Corps Air Station Yuma.

See also 
The Chocolate Cliffs are one of several parallel lines of bluffs that form the Grand Staircase in Utah.

Mountain ranges of the Sonoran Desert
Mountain ranges of the Lower Colorado River Valley
Mountain ranges of La Paz County, Arizona
Mountain ranges of Arizona